Genestia is a genus of beetles in the family Buprestidae, containing the following species:

 Genestia achardi Obenberger, 1926
 Genestia jakovlevi Obenberger, 1928
 Genestia klapaleki Obenberger, 1928
 Genestia mateui Cobos, 1953
 Genestia mocquerysi Thery, 1923
 Genestia raffrayi Thery, 1923
 Genestia semenovi Obenberger, 1926
 Genestia steeleae Thery, 1937
 Genestia tuberculifrons Obenberger, 1926

References

Buprestidae genera